Forest Park High School may refer to:
 Forest Park High School (Indiana), in Ferdinand, Indiana, United States
 Forest Park High School (Georgia), in Forest Park, Georgia, United States
 Forest Park High School (Maryland), in Baltimore, Maryland, United States
 Forest Park High School (Michigan), In Crystal Falls, Michigan, United States
 Forest Park High School (Beaumont, Texas), in Beaumont, Texas, United States
 Forest Park High School (Woodbridge, Virginia), in Woodbridge, Virginia, United States